Dr. Bhupen Hazarika Regional Government Film and Television Institute, formerly known as the Jyoti Chitraban Film and Television Institute, is the only government-owned film institute in northeastern India located at Sila, Changsari in Assam. It was named after Jyoti Prasad Agarwala, the first Assamese film director and producer. The Jyoti Chitraban Film Studio was established in the year of 1961 by the Government of Assam. The Film Institute was set up at the same Studio premises using the same infrastructure in the year 1999.

History

Having seen the increasing demands for technically well-equipped film technicians in the regional film industry in the last few of years of the 20th century, the Governing Body of Jyoti Chitraban (Film Studio) Society (JCFS) decided to establish a film institute in the Jyoti Chitraban film studio. In this regard the society has acquired the formal permission from the Ministry of Education, Govt. of Assam vide letter No. TEC. 131/96/22 dated Dispur, 14 December 1998 to establish the institute & thus the institute came into existence on 17 January 1999. by the name Jyoti Chitraban Film and Television Institute (JCFTI).

Jyoti Chitraban (Film Studio) Society remained as the mother concern providing all sorts of existing audio-visual equipments of the studio and other logistics required to run the institute till 2011. In 2011 the institute was bifurcated from the studio and became a complete government entity by the name Regional Government Film and Television Institute (RGFTI).  Then again in 2016 the institute was renamed as Dr. Bhupen Hazarika Regional Government Film and Television Institute (DBHRGFTI) by the Govt. of Assam.

For many years DBHRGFTI was the only institute of its kind in the entire north-eastern region of India. It’s a regional center of excellence in the field of film & television education and programme production. The institute, considered as one of the leading film & television institutes of the country, emphasizes on holistic development of its students as a film maker through interactive practical training on various aspects of film education. A closely networked industry-institute interface is ensured through invitation of guest lecturers from the industry, regular visits to the studios and laboratories, organizing workshops, conferences and seminars, attending film festivals etc.

The Guwahati International Film Festival (GIFF) is put on by the Jyoti Chitraban (Film Studio) Society in cooperation with the Dr. Bhupen Hazarika Regional Government Film and Television Institute in Assam, India. The festival will take place in Guwahati from October 28 through November 2 at Jyoti Chitraban Film Studio and Srimanta Sankardev Kalakshetra.

The studio today
The film studio covers an area of 73 bigha. It is equipped with ultra-modern floors, ultra-modern trolley-volley-cum-crane, 16 mm movie camera, lights etc. Till now, more than 200 films have been released from it.

Courses offered
Now the institute offers some courses related to film and television are:
 Diploma in Audiography and Sound Engineering
 Diploma in Motion Picture Photography 
 Diploma in Editing Motion Picture
 Certificate in Applied Acting

See also
 Film and Television Institute of India
 Bhartendu Natya Academy
 Cinema of India
 Film and Television Institute of India alumni
 Film school
 Satyajit Ray Film and Television Institute
 State Institute of Film and Television
 Government Film and Television Institute
 M.G.R. Government Film and Television Training Institute
 Biju Pattnaik Film and Television Institute of Odisha

References

External links
Official website

Indian film studios
Film organisations in India
Cinema of Assam
Film schools in India
Film production companies of Assam
Memorials to Bhupen Hazarika
1961 establishments in Assam
Organizations established in 1961